Bourneville may refer to:

 Bourneville, Eure, a commune in the Eure department in Haute-Normandie in northern France.
 Bourneville, Ohio, a census-designated place in central Twin Township, Ross County, Ohio, United States

People with the surname
 Désiré-Magloire Bourneville (1840–1909), French neurologist
 Mark Bourneville (born 1963), New Zealand rugby league player

See also
 Bournville (disambiguation)
 Bournonville (disambiguation)